Solf may refer to:

 Asteroid 9872 Solf, named after astronomer Josef Solf (born 1934)
 Solf (municipality), a former municipality in Ostrobothnia, Finland
 Hanna Solf, key member of the Solf Circle